São Gabriel (Portuguese for "Saint Gabriel") may refer to:

Brazil

Municipalities
 São Gabriel, Bahia
 São Gabriel, Rio Grande do Sul
 São Gabriel do Oeste, in Mato Grosso do Sul
 São Gabriel da Cachoeira, in Amazonas
 São Gabriel da Palha, Espírito Santo

Other uses
 São Gabriel (ship), flagship of Vasco da Gama's armada
 São Gabriel Futebol Clube — de São Gabriel (Rio Grande do Sul)